Safilguda railway station (station code:SFX) is a railway station in Hyderabad, Telangana, India. Localities including Safilguda, Old Neredmet and Anandbagh are accessible from this station.

Lines
Hyderabad Multi-Modal Transport System
Secunderabad–Bolarum (BS Line)

References

External links
MMTS Timings as per South Central Railway

MMTS stations in Ranga Reddy district
Hyderabad railway division